José Gabriel Carrizo Jaén (born 25 June 1983) is a Panamanian politician who is serving as the  Vice President of Panama since 1 July  2019. He is a member of the Democratic Revolutionary Party since 2007.

Early life	
Carrizo was born on 25 June 1983, and lived with his parents and two brothers in  Penonomé. He studied at the University of Santa María la Antigua (USMA), and obtained a bachelor's degree in political and civil rights in 2000. He was also the head of the student association of the university.

Personal life
Carrizo  is married to Julieta Spiegel. Together they have three children

Professional career
José Carrizo began his career as a lawyer. He, along with his lawyer friends, established a forensic C&A firm. The firm was involved in construction, live stocks and various sectors.

References

1983 births
Living people
Vice presidents of Panama
People from Panama City
Democratic Revolutionary Party politicians